Ya-Qin Zhang (born in 1966) is a Chinese-American scientist, technologist and business executive. He is currently a Chair Professor at Tsinghua University and the founding Dean of the Tsinghua institute for AI Industry Research (AIR) .

Zhang was President of Baidu Inc.(NASDAQ:BIDU) from September 2014 to October 2019. He was previously a key executive of Microsoft for 16 years, including Corporate Vice President for mobile and embedded Products in Redmond, Washington, managing director of Microsoft Research Asia, and Chairman of Microsoft China. 

Zhang is a world-renowned scientist with his 500+ publications, 60 US patents. and numerous contributions to global standards and products in digital video, AI/machine learning, cloud computing, and autonmous driving.  He is elected to Chinese Academy of Sciences,   American Academy of Arts and Sciences , National Academy of Inventors, and  Australia National Academy of Engineering (ATSE) . He became an IEEE Fellow in 1997 at the age of 31, making him the youngest scientist winning this honor in the 100+ year history of the organization. He received the industry pioneer award from IEEE for his seminal contributions and technical leadership in digital video and communications in 2004. Upon his winning of "Outstanding Young Electrical Engineer Award" in 1998, Zhang received a congratulation letter from then US president Bill Clinton, praising him as "an inspiration for others".

Zhang currently serves on the Board of Directors of three public companies, and holds board membership and adjunct professorship in five prestigious universities. He was named one of the top 10 CEOs in Asia, 50 global shapers, Executive of the year, IT innovator leader award by IT Times, Business Week, CNBC, Global business and Vision magazine. One of the prominent figures in artificial intelligence and autonoumous driving, Zhang serves on the board of stewardship for the future of mobility of the Davos World Economic Forum, and is the Chairman of the Apollo Alliance, the largest open platform for autonomous driving in the world. Zhang is a founding member of UNDP (United Nations Development Program) Private Sector.

Zhang was born in Taiyuan, Shanxi, in January 1966, and is married with two children.

Education 
At age 12, Zhang was admitted to the University of Science and Technology of China , then the youngest college student in the country. He earned a PhD in Electrical Engineering from George Washington University, had executive trainings at Harvard University, and was awarded a honorary Doctorate from Univ. of Surrey.

Career

Microsoft Corporation
Over his 16-year tenure at Microsoft, Ya-Qin Zhang has taken various key positions, including the managing director of Microsoft Research Asia (1999-2004), Chairman of Microsoft China Limited (2007-2013), Corporate Vice President of Mobile and Embedded Products (2004-2006), Asia-Pacific R&D Chairman and Corporate Vice President until September 2014.

He was a co-founder of Microsoft Research China in 1999 as the inaugural Chief Scientist, and then became the managing director in 2000 after its founding director Kai-Fu Lee's promotion and relocation to Microsoft HQ. It was under Zhang's leadership that Microsoft Research China was elevated to Microsoft Research Asia in 2002, which has become a premier computer science research center in the world. He was the founding Chairman of Microsoft Asia R&D Group (ARD), the largest R&D center for Microsoft outside of US, with over 5000 scientists and engineers.

In 2011, Zhang founded the Microsoft venture Accelerator in Beijing, and has become one of the most vibrant start-up engines in China with over 200 companies incubated over the years.

Baidu Inc
Zhang joined Baidu Inc. as president of the company in 2014 and retired in October 2019. Baidu is a leading Internet company in search, mobility, AI and cloud computing. As President, Zhang worked closely with founder Robin Li in pivoting the company to new technolgy and business arena, including intelligent cloud, autonomous driving, sillicon technology, industrial AI, and new emerging business.

Tsinghua University 
Zhang joined Tsinghua University as the Chair Professor of AI Science, with a joint appointment from the School of Computer Science and School of Vehicle and Mobility. He is the founding Dean of the Institute for AI Industry Research (AIR), focusing on scientific research and technological innovation for the fourth industry revolution, such as autonomous driving, AI+green computing, and AI+life science.

Awards, appointments and fellowships 
Chinese Academy of Engineering, 2021
American Academy of Arts and Sciences, 2019
National Academy of Inventors, 2021
 Australia Academy of Technology and Engineering (ATSE), 2017
 Fellow of IEEE/CAAI/AAAS/APAI/ATSE
 Member, Monaco Digital Advisory Council, 2019
 Top Ten AI Innovator of the year, Global Mobile Internet Congress (GMIC), 2017
 Board of visitors, Engineering School at Columbia University, 2016
 Member, Private Sector Board, United Nation Development Program (UNDP), 2016
 Intl Advisory board, Cornell University, 2015
 Honorary Fellow, Hong Kong Univ. of Science and Technology, 2012
 International Advisory Board, National IT Center of Australia, Sydney, Australia, 2008-2011
 Engineer of the Year, Asia Engineering Society, 2007
 Best paper awards, IEEE (Trans. Multimedia, Trans. Video Tech, JSAC), 2000, 2003, 2004, 2007
 Industrial Pioneer Award, IEEE, 2004
 International Advisory Panel, Multimedia Supercorridor, Malaysia, 2004-2011
 Advisor to National Science Foundation, China (2001-2004)
 Editor-in-Chief, IEEE Trans. Circuits and Systems for Video Technology (CSVT),1997-1999
The Outstanding Young Electrical Engineer of 1998, 1998

Others 
Zhang is a member of the Committee of 100, a group of leading Chinese-Americans to promote the cultural, scientific, social, and economic exchanges between the US and China.

Zhang serves on the Strategic Committee of the France China Foundation. The France China Foundation encourages the development of relationship between French and Chinese leaders, to stimulate their interest in the other country and to inspire them to set up joint projects.

References 

1966 births
Living people
University of Science and Technology of China alumni
Chinese business executives
Businesspeople from Shanxi
Baidu people
Microsoft people
Microsoft Research people
Fellow Members of the IEEE
George Washington University School of Engineering and Applied Science alumni
Chinese electronics engineers
20th-century Chinese engineers
21st-century Chinese engineers
Academic journal editors
Chinese expatriates in the United States
People from Taiyuan
Chinese computer businesspeople